North Industry (also Slabtown or Slab Town) is an unincorporated community in southern Canton Township, Stark County, Ohio, United States, along the Nimishillen Creek.  Its altitude is 1,001 feet (305 m). The community is part of the Canton–Massillon Metropolitan Statistical Area. North Industry is often referred to as "Canton South" by the local residents.

History
A post office called North Industry was established in 1832, and remained in operation until 1956. Early industries at North Industry included a blast furnace and a watermill.

Education
Children from North Industry attend the schools of the Canton Local School District.

References

Unincorporated communities in Stark County, Ohio
Unincorporated communities in Ohio